Lernahovit is a village in the Gegharkunik Province of Armenia. Located on the road between Lake Sevan and the Vardenyats mountain pass, near Madina. It is part of the Geghhovit community.

References

External links 

Armenia Tour

Populated places in Gegharkunik Province